The Steamboat Adventures of Riverboat Bill is a 1987 animated Australian film set on the Murray River at the turn of the century. It was based on a popular children's novel by Cliff Green.

References

External links

Australian television films
1987 films
1980s English-language films